The Helmet is an informal term for a highland mass within southern Oceanus Procellarum on the near side of the Moon, southeast of the crater Herigonius. The astronauts of Apollo 16 used the term to refer to the feature during the mission.  The name derives from the roughly semicircular shape of the border of the feature, resembling a helmet.   The feature is topographically higher and of a higher albedo than the surrounding mare lava plain.

Two mountains within The Helmet are informally named Herigonius Eta (η) and Herigonius Pi (π).  Eta is the larger mountain on the northern edge of the Helmet, and Pi is along the southwest edge.

The selenographic coordinates of this feature are 16.8° S, 31.6° W.

External links
 Herigonius Pi & Eta, Lunar Photo of the Day, January 28, 2007
 A Colorful Helmet, Lunar Photo of the Day, January 29, 2007

References

Geological features on the Moon